In enzymology, a 3-hydroxymethylcephem carbamoyltransferase is an enzyme that catalyzes the chemical reaction

carbamoyl phosphate + a 3-hydroxymethylceph-3-em-4-carboxylate  phosphate + a 3-carbamoyloxymethylcephem

Thus, the two substrates of this enzyme are carbamoyl phosphate and 3-hydroxymethylceph-3-em-4-carboxylate, whereas its two products are phosphate and 3-carbamoyloxymethylcephem.

This enzyme belongs to the family of transferases, that transfer one-carbon groups, specifically the carboxy- and carbamoyltransferases. 

The systematic name of this enzyme class is carbamoyl-phosphate:3-hydroxymethylceph-3-em-4-carboxylate carbamoyltransferase. 

This enzyme has at least one effector, ATP.

References

 

EC 2.1.3
Enzymes of unknown structure